Thapki Pyar Ki 2 ( A light touch of love 2) is an Indian television series that premiered on 4 October 2021 on Colors TV. Produced by Shoonya Square Productions, it is a spiritual sequel to the 2015 series Thapki Pyar Ki. It starred Jigyasa Singh and Prachi Bansal as Thapki and Aakash Ahuja as Purab.

Plot
Blessed with a melodious voice, Vaani "Thapki" Tripathi stammers whenever nervous, that is a major obstacle on her path of dreams. Her role-model Veena Devi, a Padma Shri awardee has a rich and handsome son, Purab. Thapki's mother Jaya lost her voice when her father Mukul left them years ago. He now lives with his second wife's daughter Hansika, a gold digger and Purab's colleague.

Upon hearing Thapki's voice, Veena in deeply impressed and wants Thapki to marry Purab who instead chooses to marry Hansika even though he doesn't love her. As per Veena's plans in a turn of events, Thapki weds Purab. Veena discovers her stuttering and now wants to throw her out. Purab agrees to leave her but then changes his decision due to a promise he made to thapki's mother Jaya to support Thapki. They help each other in every moment. Slowly Purab and Thapki fall in love with each other.

Cast

Main 
Jigyasa Singh / Prachi Bansal as Vaani "Thapki" Agarwal Singhania – Jaya and Mukul's daughter; Hansika's half-sister; Preeti and Anshul's cousin sister; Purab's wife. (2021-2022)
Aakash Ahuja as Purab Singhania – Veena and Vinod's son; Sargam's brother; Armaan and Sagar's cousin; Thapki and Hansika's husband (2021-2022)
Rachana Mistry as Hansika Agrawal Singhania – Anjali and Mukul's daughter; Jaya's stepdaughter;Thapki's half-sister; Purab's second/half wife (2021–2022)

Recurring
Jaya Bhattacharya as Veena Devi Singhania – Vinod's wife; Sargam and Purab's mother (2021–2022) 
Arup Pal as Vinod Singhania – Jayanti's elder son; Pramod's brother; Veena's husband; Sargam and Purab's father (2021–2022)
Rudra Kaushish as Mukul Agarwal – Jaya and Anjali's husband; Thapki and Hansika's father (2021–2022)
Akshaya Bhingarde as Jaya Tripathi Agarwal – Ashok's sister; Mukul's first wife; Thapki's mother (2021–2022)
Shital Antani as Sapna Singhania – Pramod's widow; Armaan and Sagar's mother (2021–2022)
Additi Chopra as Sargam Singhania – Veena and Vinod's daughter; Purab's sister; Armaan and Sagar's cousin sister (2021–2022)
Pratish Vora as Ashok Tripathi – Jaya's brother; Sudha's husband; Anshul and Preeti's father (2021–2022)
Urvashi Upadhyay as Sudha Tripathi – Ashok's wife; Preeti and Anshul's mother (2021–2022)
Farida Dadi as Jayanti Singhania – Vinod and Pramod's mother; Sargam, Armaan, Purab and Sagar's grandmother (2021–2022)
Preetesh Manas/Samaksh Sudi as Sagar Singhania – Sapna and Neeraj's son; Priyanka's husband; Armaan's brother; Sargam and Purab's cousin brother (2021)/(2021–2022)
Somesh Sharma as Anshul Tripathi – Ashok and Sudha's son; Preeti's brother; Thapki's cousin brother (2021-2022)
Neha Yadav as Priyanka Sagar Singhania – Sagar's wife (2021–2022)
Rajvir Yadav as Shankar Kumar: Singhania family's servant (2021–2022)
Nandini Maurya as Preeti Tripathi: Ashok and Sudha's daughter (2021-2022)
 Tulika Patel as Anjali Mukul Agarwal: Mukul's wife; Hansika's mother; Thapki's stepmother (2021-2022)

Production

Development and casting
Production of the series began in August 2021.

When the second season was in pre-production, Jigyasa Singh who played Thapki in the first season, was then appearing in another Colors soap opera Shakti – Astitva Ke Ehsaas Ki as Heer Singh. Later when her character was killed off in August-end, she signed the second season of this series. Aakash Ahuja was cast as Purab Singhania and Jaya Bhattacharya was cast as Veena Devi Singhania. Jigyasa Singh quit the show in February 2022 owing to health issues. In February 2022, Prachi Bansal replaced Jigyasa Singh as Thapki.

References

Indian television soap operas
Colors TV original programming
Hindi-language television shows